Timothy P. Sneller (born June 20, 1956) is an American politician, who has served in the Michigan House of Representatives since 2017, representing the 50th District as a member of the United States Democratic Party.

Prior to his election to the legislature, Sneller worked on the legislative staffs of various state representatives and senators in the Genesee County area.

He was first elected in the 2016 elections, and was reelected to a second term in office in 2018. In his first term in office he introduced a bill to ban non-therapeutic debarking of dogs, and was a supporter of Adam Zemke's bill to ban LGBT conversion therapy.

He is openly gay.

References

External links

Living people
1956 births
University of Michigan–Flint alumni
Democratic Party members of the Michigan House of Representatives
LGBT state legislators in Michigan
Politicians from Flint, Michigan
21st-century American politicians
Gay politicians